Expo Channel is an Australian home shopping channel. It is owned by parent company Direct Group Pty Ltd, a marketing and direct sales company based in the Sydney suburb of Frenches Forrest, which also owns sister channel TVSN.

History
In 2002, Optus TV launched Expo Channel on its cable television platform. Today, the channel is broadcast 24 hours a day on the major Australian subscription television platforms, as well as Freeview in some areas.

Availability and Live Stream
Most Australian pay television services carry Expo Channel as part of their basic subscription package. These services include Foxtel, Austar and Optus TV. The trial datacasting service Digital Forty Four in Sydney carried the channel free-to-air, on channel 49, from 2006 to its discontinuation on 30 April 2010, as well as via the Optus C1 satellite. Also, the Freeview channel Seven Regional owned by Seven West Media also airs overnight blocks from Expo Channel. In addition, the company's website broadcasts a live video stream of the channel.

See also
 TVSN – Expo's sister home shopping channel.
 Shopping channels – A list of home shopping channels worldwide.
 Digital Forty Four

References

External links

Expo Channel at LyngSat Address

Home shopping television stations in Australia
Television channels and stations established in 2002
English-language television stations in Australia
2002 establishments in Australia
Digital Forty Four